Albert De Bunné (born 16 February 1896, date of death unknown) was a Belgian cyclist. In 1919 he won the Belgian Amateur Road-Championships. He won the bronze medal in the Team road race  in the 1920 Summer Olympics, next to a fifth place in the Individual road race and a fourth place in the 4,000 metres Team pursuit.

References

1896 births
Year of death missing
Belgian male cyclists
Olympic cyclists of Belgium
Olympic bronze medalists for Belgium
Cyclists at the 1920 Summer Olympics
Olympic medalists in cycling
Cyclists from Brussels
Medalists at the 1920 Summer Olympics
20th-century Belgian people